The England–Scotland Amateur Match was an annual men's amateur golf competition between teams representing England and Scotland.  It was played from 1902 to 1931, although the match lapsed between 1913 and 1921. The match continued after 1931 but as part of the Men's Home Internationals in which Ireland and Wales also competed. Until 1931 it was played in connection with the Amateur Championship, on the Saturday either before or after the championship.

History
The 1902 match was decided by holes. After the morning round Scotland led in 5 matches, England in 4 with one level. At that point Scotland led by just one hole 14–13. In the afternoon rounds Scotland led in 6 matches, England in 3 with one level. In the afternoon matches alone Scotland won by 6 holes, 18–12. Over the 36 holes Scotland had won 6 of the 10 matches, England winning the other 4, Scotland winning by 28 holes in their 6 wins, England by 21 in their 4 wins. Some sources give the result as 32–25, the sum of the morning and afternoon results, while others give 28–21. Either way, Scotland won by 7 holes.

The event lapsed after 1912. A match was planned for 1921 but was cancelled because a match between Britain and America had been arranged, the forerunner of the Walker Cup matches.

Starting in 1927 Scotland and Ireland had played an annual match. In 1927 and 1929 this was held in Ireland, before the Irish Amateur Open Championship, while in 1928 and 1930 it was held in Scotland, just before the England–Scotland match.

The 1931 Amateur Championship was held at Royal North Devon. On the previous occasions that it had been held there, there were far fewer Scottish entries than normal and as a consequence the Scottish team was not fully representative. It was therefore decided to hold the England–Scotland match at a different time and on a different venue, being played at Royal Liverpool in August. In addition it was decided to play a match between England and Ireland on the day before. Ireland and Scotland had already decided to hold their match in Ireland in September. It was later arranged that a Welsh team should attend, playing matches against Scotland and Ireland on the days when England were playing Ireland and Scotland. England beat Ireland 10–4 while Wales lost 2–12 to Scotland and 2–11 to Ireland. England did not play Wales. With Scotland winning both their matches and then beating Ireland the following month, they were the unofficial champion country.

The Men's Home Internationals, in which all four countries play each other, started in 1932. In 1952 Raymond Oppenheimer, an ex-England and Walker Cup captain, presented a trophy for the tournament, known as the Raymond Trophy.

Format
The 1902 match had teams of 10, who played singles matches over 36 holes. All 36 holes were played and the overall result was decided by holes won. From 1903 the teams were reduced to 9-a-side and the result was decided by matches. Extra holes were played if necessary to achieve a result. The format was changed for 1912, the main consisting of 5 foursomes matches rather than 9 singles.

When the event was revived in 1922 the format was changed. There were teams of 10 playing 5 foursomes matches in the morning and 10 singles in the afternoon. Matches were over 18 holes with halved matches not counting.

Results

The 1902 match was decided by holes.

Appearances
The following are those who played in at least one of the matches.

England

1902–1912
 Colin Aylmer 1911
 John Ball 1902, 1903, 1904, 1905, 1906, 1907, 1908, 1909, 1910, 1911, 1912
 Herbert Barker 1907
 Gordon Barry 1906, 1907
 Johnnie Bramston 1902
 Frank Carr 1911
 Horace Castle 1903, 1904
 Harry Colt 1908
 Bernard Darwin 1902, 1904, 1905, 1908, 1909, 1910
 Reymond de Montmorency 1908
 Herman de Zoete 1903, 1904, 1906, 1907
 Humphrey Ellis 1902, 1912
 William Herbert Fowler 1903, 1904, 1905
 Sidney Fry 1902, 1903, 1904, 1905, 1906, 1907, 1909
 Harold Gillies 1908
 Angus Hambro 1908, 1909, 1910
 Harold Hambro 1905
 Harold Hilton 1902, 1903, 1904, 1905, 1906, 1907, 1909, 1910, 1911, 1912
 Charles Hooman 1910
 Charles Hutchings 1902
 Horace Hutchinson 1902, 1903, 1904, 1906, 1907, 1909
 Edward Lassen 1909, 1910, 1911, 1912
 Alan Lincoln 1907
 Abe Mitchell 1910, 1911, 1912
 Frank Mitchell 1906, 1907, 1908
 Chales Palmer 1909
 Beaumont Pease 1903, 1904, 1905, 1906
 Vivian Pollock 1908
 Michael Scott 1911, 1912
 Osmund Scott 1902, 1905, 1906
 Edward Scratton 1912
 Everard Martin Smith 1908, 1909, 1910, 1912
 George Smith 1902, 1903
 Leicester Stevens 1912
 Herbert Taylor 1911
 Frank Woolley 1910, 1911, 1912
 James Worthington 1905

1922–1931
 Colin Aylmer 1922, 1923, 1924
 John Beck 1926, 1930
 John Beddard 1927, 1928, 1929
 Harry Bentley 1931
 Dale Bourn 1930
 Carl Bretherton 1922, 1923, 1924, 1925
 Leonard Crawley 1931
 Bernard Darwin 1923, 1924
 John de Forest 1931
 Froes Ellison 1922, 1925, 1926, 1927
 Eric Fiddian 1929, 1930, 1931
 Harold Gillies 1925, 1926, 1927
 Angus Hambro 1922
 Ronald Hardman 1927, 1928
 Rex Hartley 1926, 1927, 1928, 1929, 1930, 1931
 Lister Hartley 1927, 1931
 Ernest Hassall 1923
 Cecil Hayward 1925
 Charles Hodgson  1924
 Ernest Holderness 1922, 1923, 1924, 1925, 1926, 1928
 Charles Hooman 1922
 Geoffrey Illingworth 1929
 Noel Layton 1922, 1923, 1926
 Gustav Mellin 1922
 Raymond Oppenheimer 1930
 Philip Perkins 1927, 1928, 1929
 W Powell 1923, 1924
 Samuel Robinson 1925
 Sidney Roper 1931
 Michael Scott 1923, 1924, 1925, 1926
 Eric Martin Smith 1931
 Eustace Storey 1924, 1925, 1926, 1927, 1928, 1930
 Bill Stout 1928, 1929, 1930, 1931
 Bill Sutton 1929, 1931
 William Tweddell 1928, 1929, 1930
 Cyril Tolley 1922, 1923, 1924, 1925, 1926, 1927, 1928, 1929, 1930
 Roger Wethered 1922, 1923, 1924, 1925, 1926, 1927, 1928, 1929, 1930

In their match against Ireland in 1931 England had the same team that played against Scotland the following day.

Scotland

1902–1912
 Archibald Aitken 1906, 1907, 1908
 Robert Andrew 1905, 1906, 1907, 1908, 1909, 1910
 Leslie Balfour-Melville 1902, 1903
 Harold Beveridge 1908
 Edward Blackwell 1902, 1904, 1905, 1906, 1907, 1909, 1910, 1912
 Arnold Blyth 1904
 Guy Campbell 1909, 1910, 1911
 Charles Dick 1902, 1903, 1904, 1905, 1909, 1912
 Walter Fairlie 1912
 Samuel Mure Fergusson 1902, 1903, 1904
 John Gairdner 1902
 John Graham Jr. 1902, 1903, 1904, 1905, 1906, 1907, 1908, 1909, 1910, 1911
 Robert Harris 1905, 1908, 1910, 1911, 1912
 Norman Hunter 1903, 1912
 Cecil Hutchison 1904, 1905, 1906, 1907, 1908, 1909, 1910, 1911, 1912
 James Jenkins 1908, 1912
 Johnny Laidlay 1902, 1903, 1904, 1905, 1906, 1907, 1908, 1909, 1910, 1911
 Gordon Lockhart 1911, 1912
 John L. Low 1904
 Charles Macfarlane 1912
 Fred Mackenzie 1902, 1903
 Robert Maxwell 1902, 1903, 1904, 1905, 1906, 1907, 1909, 1910
 James Robb 1902, 1903, 1905, 1906, 1907
 James Robertson-Durham 1911
 Frank Scroggie 1910
 Gordon Simpson 1906, 1907, 1908, 1909, 1911, 1912
 George Wilkie 1911

1922–1931
 Alex Armour 1922
 Edward Blackwell 1923, 1924, 1925
 Jack Bookless 1930, 1931
 Harry Braid 1922, 1923
 Tom Burrell 1924
 William Campbell 1928, 1929, 1930, 1931
 John Caven 1926
 James Dawson 1930, 1931
 Robert Denholm 1931
 Charles Gibb 1927
 Allan Graham 1925
 William Guild 1925, 1927, 1928
 Robert Harris 1922, 1923, 1924, 1925, 1926, 1927, 1928
 William Hope 1923, 1925, 1926, 1927, 1928, 1929
 Willie Hunter 1922
 Andrew Jamieson Jr. 1927, 1928, 1931
 James Jenkins 1922, 1924, 1926, 1928
 Dennis Kyle 1924, 1930
 Edward Kyle 1925
 Jack Lang 1929, 1931
 Willis Mackenzie 1923, 1926, 1927, 1929
 Gilbert Manford 1922, 1923
 Archibald McCallum 1929
 Sam McKinlay 1929, 1930, 1931
 Eric McRuvie 1929, 1930, 1931
 Alex Menzies 1925
 William Murray 1923, 1924, 1925, 1926, 1927
 Thomas Osgood 1925
 Robert Scott Jr. 1924, 1928
 Fred Simpson 1927
 Gordon Simpson 1922, 1924, 1926
 John Nelson Smith 1929, 1930, 1931
 Keith Thorburn 1928
 Tony Torrance 1922, 1923, 1925, 1926, 1928, 1929, 1930
 William Breck Torrance 1922, 1923, 1924, 1926, 1927, 1928, 1930
 William Tulloch 1927, 1929, 1930, 1931
 John Wilson 1922, 1923, 1924, 1926

In their match against Wales in 1931 Scotland had the same team that played against England the following day.

References

Team golf tournaments
Recurring sporting events established in 1902